Solo is the debut studio album by American R&B group Solo, released September 12, 1995 via Perspective Records. The album was executive produced by Jimmy Jam and Terry Lewis, and it peaked at No. 52 on the Billboard 200.

Four singles were released from the album: "Heaven", "Where Do U Want Me to Put It", "He's Not Good Enough" and "Blowin' My Mind". "Heaven" is the group's highest chart appearance to date on the Billboard Hot 100, peaking at No. 42. The album contains covers of five songs originally recorded by Sam Cooke: "Another Saturday Night", "A Change Is Gonna Come", "Cupid", "Everybody Loves to Cha Cha Cha" and "(What a) Wonderful World". A cover of "Under the Boardwalk", originally recorded by The Drifters, was also included.

Track listing
 Songwriting and production credits adapted from liner notes.

Samples

A.
B.
C.

Charts

Weekly charts

Year-end charts

References

External links
 
 

1995 debut albums
Albums produced by Jimmy Jam and Terry Lewis
Perspective Records albums
Solo (American band) albums